"I Second That Emotion" is a 1967 song written by Smokey Robinson and Al Cleveland. First charting as a hit for Smokey Robinson and the Miracles on the Tamla/Motown label in 1967, "I Second That Emotion" was later a hit single for the group duet Diana Ross & the Supremes and The Temptations, also on the Motown label.

Song origin
One morning in 1967, Robinson and Cleveland were shopping at Hudson's, a Detroit department store. Robinson found a set of pearls for his wife, Claudette. "They're beautiful." he said to the salesperson. "I sure hope she likes them." Cleveland then added "I second that emotion." Both songwriters laughed at Cleveland's malapropism; he had meant to say "I second that motion." The two were immediately inspired to write a song using the incorrect phrase.

The Miracles' original version
The Miracles' original version of the song finds lead singer and co-writer Smokey Robinson courting a girl who, weary of the game of love, prefers to string her men along and not get romantically involved. Robinson "wants no part" in such a relationship, but promises that if the girl changes her mind, he'll be around ("If you feel like lovin' me/if you've got the notion/I second that emotion.")

This version peaked for three weeks in the United States at No. 4 on the Billboard Hot 100 in December 1967. It became the Miracles highest charting popular single since "Shop Around". In this song, guitarists Eddie Willis and Robert White came up with their own guitar licks and riffs for this song based on a chord chart that was given to them by Robinson (this is a classic example of the creativity the Funk Brothers brought to the table during the recording sessions they participated in at the Snake Pit). Regular Miracles guitarist Marv Tarplin was also present on the song.

The song also topped the Billboard Best Selling R&B Singles chart and was a million-selling hit for The Miracles, their sixth overall. The song was also a top 30 hit in the UK in 1967, reaching No. 27.

Cash Box called it an "electrically sparkling slow-midspeed session" with "outstanding lead and the well worked team sound."

Personnel 
The Miracles
 Lead vocals by Smokey Robinson
 Background vocals by Claudette Rogers Robinson, Pete Moore, Ronnie White, and Bobby Rogers.
 Guitar by Marv Tarplin
 Other instrumentation by  The Funk Brothers
 Eddie Willis - guitar
 Robert White - guitar

Charts

Diana Ross & the Supremes and The Temptations version

The song was covered and released by a group duet of Motown labelmates Diana Ross & the Supremes and The Temptations in 1969.  This version peaked at No. 18 in the UK.

Personnel
 Lead vocals by Diana Ross and Eddie Kendricks
 Background vocals by Mary Wilson, Cindy Birdsong, Dennis Edwards, Paul Williams, Otis Williams, and Melvin Franklin
 Instrumentation by  The Funk Brothers
 Guitar by Marv Tarplin

Track listing 
7" single (1969) (United Kingdom)
"I Second That Emotion" – 2:55
"The Way You Do the Things You Do" – 1:39

Charts

Japan version

"I Second That Emotion" was covered by British new wave band Japan, originally released as a single in 1980 without success. The single was re-released in 1982, on the back of the band's increased success in 1981, peaking at number 9 in the UK Singles Chart in July, making it their second most successful single after "Ghosts".

Releases 
The song was first released in March 1980 in the UK with a fade-out version of "Quiet Life" on the B-side. In Japan, "Quiet Life" had been released as a single in 1979, so "European Son" was released as the B-side instead. In 1982, the song was remixed by Steve Nye and released as a single, with the B-side "Halloween" originally released on the album Quiet Life. In Australia, the single was released with the B-side as the 1978 re-recorded version of "Adolescent Sex", originally from the band's debut album of the same name.

Track listings 
7": Ariola Hansa / AHA 559 (1980, UK)

 "I Second That Emotion" – 3:45
 "Quiet Life" – 3:51

7": Ariola Hansa / VIPX-1501 (1980, Japan)

 "I Second That Emotion" – 3:46
 "European Son" – 3:40

7": Hansa / HANSA 12 (1982, UK)

 "I Second That Emotion" – 3:52
 "Halloween" – 4:23

12": Hansa / HANSA 12-12 (1982, UK)

 "I Second That Emotion" (extended remix) – 5:15
 "Halloween" – 4:23
7": RCA Victor / 104039 (1982, Australia)

 "I Second That Emotion" – 3:50
 "Adolescent Sex" – 4:10

Personnel 

 David Sylvian – vocals, guitar, keyboards
 Richard Barbieri – keyboards
 Rob Dean – guitar
 Mick Karn – fretless bass, saxophone
 Steve Jansen – drums
 John Punter – producer
 Nigel Walker – engineer
 Steve Nye – remixing (1982)

Charts

In popular culture
The song was often performed by the Jerry Garcia Band. Between the years 1976 to 1994, the Jerry Garcia Band performed the song 154 times, not including seven live performances by the Grateful Dead.

In 1983, the song appeared on The Big Chill soundtrack Disc 1, Track 8.

"I Second That Emotion" is the title of a 1999 Futurama episode.

On June 18, 2012, American Songwriter named "I Second That Emotion" its "Lyric of The Week". The publication wrote: the song "marches to the beat of its own drum, thanks to three stanzas of crafty doo-wop poetry and one punny one-liner—a malapropism, if you want to get technical—that never really loses its novelty appeal".

References

Further reading
 I Second That Emotion- by The Miracles - Joel Francis' song review for The Daily Record

1967 singles
1969 singles
1980 singles
1982 singles
1967 songs
Tamla Records singles
Hansa Records singles
The Miracles songs
Motown singles
Song recordings produced by Smokey Robinson
Songs written by Al Cleveland
Songs written by Smokey Robinson
The Supremes songs
The Temptations songs
Japan (band) songs